Mars vs Venus (Simplified Chinese: 幸福双人床) is a Singaporean Chinese drama which was telecast on Singapore's free-to-air channel, MediaCorp TV Channel 8. It made its debut on 1 May 2007 and ended its run on 28 May 2007. It was screened on every weekday night, 9pm. This drama serial consists of 20 episodes. The name of this show refers to the book Men Are from Mars, Women Are from Venus by John Gray.

The theme of the drama is mainly to showcase the differences between the two sexes. The show consists of four different couples, each having relationship problems. They are played by, namely: Tay Ping Hui and Huang Biren, Pierre Png and Jesseca Liu, Cavin Soh and May Phua, Chen Tianwen and Aileen Tan.

This show is the third Highest Rated Drama Series for Year 2007.

Cast

Main cast

 Tay Ping Hui as Steven 刘一凡
 Huang Biren as Xie Wen Jing 谢文静 Many executive producers of MediaCorp have hinted that Huang Biren was a potential Best Actress Award winner for the  Star Awards 2007 for this show due to the interesting role she acted as. She acted as a fierce, naggy and fat housewife for the first time in her 20-year career.
 Pierre Png as William 李威联
 Jesseca Liu as Zi Ling 翁紫玲

Supporting Cast

Synopsis

Steven (Tay Ping Hui) VS Wen Jing (Huang Bi Ren)
They got married in a haste because Wenjing was pregnant. Because of that, they were forced to stay together. Lack of understanding for each other, they are constantly arguing. Though there was constant arguing, they managed to keep their marriage going for 8 years and they have 1 daughter named Fang Fang, and 1 son named Wen Wen. Their marriage ends up in a divorce with the constant interference from Steven's mother (Li Yin Zhu), who hopes to find a better wife for her son in his ex-girlfriend, Aimei (Le Yao). After knowing that Aimei is a bad woman who abused Wen Wen, Steven decided to break up with Aimei once again and begs Wenjing for forgiveness and he hopes to go back to her. Would Wenjing forgive him?

Willian (Pierre Png) VS Zi Ling (Jesseca Liu)
William and Ziling are happy newly-weds who turned unhappy all too soon when reality sets in. A stay-home wife, Ziling became bored eventually while William refuses to let her go to work. Carmen, who is Ziling's best friend, then gets jealous of Ziling and decides to test their relationship by seducing William. Their marriage is further put to test when William gets to know that he is infertile (low sperm count), which would greatly reduce the chances of Ziling getting pregnant. Would their marriage be able to withstand the various problems posed?

Hanns (Cavin Soh) VS Carman (May Phua)
Carmen had a womanizer rich husband who died, while Hanns's fiancee eloped with another man while they were on honeymoon. Because of that, both had great distrust for the opposite sex and are often at loggerheads with each other, but soon get along with each other and became friends. They unwittingly fell in love but can they ever trust each other?

Yu Lian (Aileen Tan) VS Ah Wu (Chen Tian Wen)
Forty-year-old Yu Lian is the boss of a dessert shop, Yu Lian's Dessert Shop while Ah Wu is a big boss of the Pavi brand shoe company. Yu Lian has only had a single time of love life in her whole life. As such, Yu Lian is always envious of women who have plenty of boyfriends around them. Little did she know that Ah Wu is a secret admirer of her, until it was a little too late...

Awards and nominations
This drama had received the most number of nominations in the Star Awards 2007, which was a total of 6 nominations. Metamorphosis 破茧而出, Like Father, Like Daughter 宝贝父女兵, The Homecoming 十三鞭 & The Peak 最高点

Star Awards 2007 Awards and Nominations

Asian Television Awards 2007 nomination

Viewership ratings

This drama series has recorded one of the highest viewership ratings of Year 2007 to date. Ranking at 3rd position for Year 2007.

Reference

External links
Official Website (Via Wayback Machine)
Official Website (Via Wayback Machine)

Singapore Chinese dramas
2007 Singaporean television series debuts
2007 Singaporean television series endings
Channel 8 (Singapore) original programming